Ukraine's 11th electoral district is a Verkhovna Rada constituency in Vinnytsia Oblast, Central Ukraine. Established in its current form in 2012, it includes part of the city of Vinnytsia and part of Vinnytsia Raion on the west bank of the Southern Bug river. The district is home to 171,986 registered voters, and has 113 polling stations. Its member of parliament has been Maksym Pashkovskyi of the ruling Servant of the People party since 2019.

Members of Parliament

Elections

2019

2014

2012

See also
Electoral districts of Ukraine
Foreign electoral district of Ukraine

References

Electoral districts of Ukraine
Constituencies established in 2012